Florin Moldovan (born April 25, 1977, in Sighişoara, Romania), professionally known as Naomy or Naomi is a Romanian recording artist, songwriter and actress. She came to native attention when entering the Romanian preselection for the Eurovision Song Contest 2014 with her song "Dacă tu iubeşti", where she finished in 10th place, scoring 3 points. Moldovan has won the most awards at inter-county and national festivals of light music in Romania, holding a national record of 75 awards in 103 appearances, confirmed by Radio România Actualități in 1998 by Andrei Titus.

Early life
Moldovan was born as a male on April 25, 1977, in Sighişoara, Romania and grew up in an orphanage located in Luduș until she was 15 years old, where she also graduated from secondary study. Moldovan is a romani. 3 days after her birth, she was abandoned in a groove. She showed special interest in music from a very young age. Subsequently, she moved away from Luduș to Târgu Mureș and participated in a preselection enrollment for the Scoala Populara De Arta school in the singing section, where she passed the practical exam with the grade 10. Following this, she studied at that school for two consecutive years. In 1992, Moldovan moved to Bucharest, where she attended the Scoli Populare de Arta school (light music singing section) and the Palatul National Al Copiilor school.

Years later, Moldovan started to occur as a woman, with her also stating that although born man, she felt completely woman from a very young age. She had homosexual relationships starting with the age of 14. Moldovan changed her stage name to simply Naomi, following Loredana Groza's and Mircea Zara's suggest to do so.

Career

2008–present: Career beginnings
In 2008, Naomi participated at the Mamaia Music Festival with the song "Salcia", written by Ionel Tudor, and her band, Naomi International, with which she also released a jazz album in the autumn of that year. Later in 2008, she received an award for promoting lesbian, gay, bisexual and transgender culture. In 2014, Moldovan attended the Romanian preselection for the Eurovision Song Contest 2014 with her song, "Dacă tu iubeşti", which was written by Rareş Borcea and composed by Jimi Laco. The track placed in 10th place out of 12, scoring 3 points. The next year, she aroused controversy by not passing the national preselection for the Eurovision Song Contest 2015, reportedly because frequent collaborator Mădălin Voicu was unlike last year not part of the preselection's jury. In late 2015, Moldovan announced through her Facebook account that she would send two tracks she already finished, "What's Going On" and "Să-ți spun ce simt pentru noi", to the Italian, Swiss, Norwegian and Swedish preselection shows for the Eurovision Song Contest 2016. "Să-ți spun ce simt pentru noi" was written by Moldovan herself, while production was handled by Marius Constantin.

Personal life
Moldovan currently lives in Olten, Switzerland where she works at a night club and gets paid 2.000 CHF per month. She has a dog named Baby and uses female pronouns to describe herself. She has won the most awards at inter-county and national festivals of light music in Romania, holding a national record of 75 awards in 103 appearances, confirmed by Radio România Actualități in 1998 by Andrei Titus. Moldovan possesses a soprano vocal range.

In February 2015, Moldovan attempted suicide by swallowing painkiller pills. Shortly after the incident, she expressed when interviewed by Romanian newspaper Cancan that "[she] cried all night and [she] could not sleep at all. [She] was like a small child. Alone, it was hard to manage [her] emotions and grief, so [she] swallowed painkiller pills. [She is] lucky to still be alive. [She knows she] could die last night. [She is] very confused. If power will still remain, [she will] decide these days if [she] would finish with [her] life, so no one can further judge [her], or if [she] would continue [her] life and accept all the critics."

Public image
In her native Romania, Moldovan rose to prominence through supporting the gay community and having numerous TV and press appearances. She is a character  frequently parodied during the Romanian comedy show "Mondenii". Moldovan aroused controversy for her televised fights with Adriana Bahmuțeanu and Nikita at the beginning of her career.

Discography

Singles
"Dacă tu iubeşti" (2014)
"Recunosc că mi-a fost dor de tine" (2014)
"Rămâi cu mine în noaptea de Crăciun" (feat. Vladimir) (2014)

Filmography
Gadjo dilo (1997)

References

External links
Biography at Cinemarx
Biography at Showbiz

Living people
1977 births
21st-century Romanian women singers
Romanian transgender people
Romanian songwriters
Romanian actresses
Transgender women musicians
Romanian LGBT singers
Romanian LGBT songwriters
Transgender singers